The Fjellstedt School was a private boarding school in Uppsala, Sweden, founded in 1862 and closed in 1982, with the main aim of preparing students for academic studies in theology and the priesthood in the Lutheran Church of Sweden.

The Fjellstedt School Foundation has been a theological training and course institute since 1982. The foundation owns a large property between the Fyris River and Östra Ågatan in central Uppsala, where, in addition to the foundation's activities, there are also premises for the Church of Sweden's educational institute.

History 
The school has its origins in the work of priest and missionary Peter Fjellstedt (1802–1881). In 1845, money was gathered to support him and his family by enabling him to preach, establishing the Lund Missionary Society, where he became director in 1846. He and several theology professors at Uppsala University wanted to promote theological education. The institute moved first to Stockholm in 1856 and later to Uppsala in 1859, where it was renamed in 1862 and became a school for future priests: the Fjellstedt School.

The school had its own curricula with a strong focus on classical languages. In addition to modern languages, Latin was taught in five of the seven years, starting in the third year of real school, and Greek was taught for four years. These languages also had more weekly hours than in other schools in the country. From 1914, the school had compulsory Hebrew lessons in the two highest years. In 1966, the focus was broadened and a degree was established to prepare for overseas service. It included the teaching of a non-European language, such as Swahili. A church music degree was established in 1977.

The conditions at the school, with the older humanities degree, led to a one-year delay in the abolition of the traditional studentexamen. By decision of the king, the last  took place at the Fjellstedt School in 1969. Approximately 1,650 students graduated from Fjellstedtska School until the school ceased operations in 1982. Until 1939, students had to submit an explicit declaration of intent to become a priest in their application.

The Fjellstedt School Foundation now sees its task as strengthening the identity of priests and future priests – on the basis of the church's faith, confession and doctrine – in their mission as liturgists, preachers and pastors with an integrated personal Christian faith, and to work for increased knowledge and understanding of different religious orientations, theological interpretations and expressions of Christian faith within the Church of Sweden and the worldwide church. Every year, some ten courses are organized in the fields of church services, pastoral care, diaconia and international activities.

Associated people and influence 
A number of well-known priests, including 25 from the Lutheran Augustana Synod, attended the Fjellstedt School. Scholar Conrad Bergendorff notes, "It would be no exaggeration to say that the Fjellstedt influence was a predominant one in the development of the character of Swedish Lutheranism in the United States."

Notable instructors 

 Carl Axel Brolén (1845–1939), Latinist, taught 1911–1925
 Thore Christian Elias Fries (1886–1930), botanist, taught 1911–1913
 Salomon Eberhard Hanschen (1847–1930), neurologist, taught 1870–1873
 Frans Reinhold Kjellman (1846–1907), botanist, taught 1872–1878
 Henrik Samuel Nyberg (1889–1974), expert in Iranology and Arab studies, taught 1916–1927

Notable students 

 Nicolaus Bergensköld (1838–1907), clergyman
 John Elof Boodin (1869–1950), philosopher
 Olof Olsson (1841–1900), clergyman
 Åke W. Sjöberg (1924–2014), Assyriologist

Rectors 
 1862–1866: Ulrik Mikael Lundgren
 1866–1870: Nils Linnarsson
 1870–1920: Johannes Kerfstedt
 1920–1936: Gustaf Norrman
 1936–1963: Georg Landberg
 1963–1982: Allan Parkman

Directors 
 1920–1928: Adolf Kolmodin
 1929–1930: Gustaf Ljunggren
 1930–1936: Torsten Ysander
 1936–1944: Yngve Rudberg
 1945–1958: Ruben Josefson
 1982–1993: Allan Parkman
 1994–2011: Per Hansson
 2011–  Leif Nordenstorm

References

Notes

Sources

See also 

 Johannelunds Teologiska Högskola

External links 

  

Educational institutions established in 1862
Educational institutions disestablished in 1982
Church of Sweden
Seminaries and theological colleges in Sweden